Pogo Au Go Go is the first album by Houston punk rock band Bickley, released in 1996 by PaperDoll Records. After Bickley signed on to Fearless Records, the album was re-released in 1998.  The album led to Bickley gaining wide local exposure.

Personnel 
 Ben Fondled - vocals
 Uncle Dig - guitar, vocals
 Matte Finish - drums
 Rubio Coconut - bass
Additional personnel
Dan Workman - producer
Bill Fool - Backing vocals

Track listing
"Call Girl" (1:04)
"Johnny Dynomite" (1:09)
"Silly Monkey" (1:17)
"Communication" (1:58)
"Bad Car" (1:26)
"Down The Hatch" (1:58)
"Sally" (1:41)
"This Song Sucks" (2:08)
"Human Habitrail" (1:18)
"Mission and Vallejo" (2:53)
"Box Car" (originally by Jawbreaker) (1:32)
"Arkansas Death Ride" (2:04)
"Piss Fetish" (1:24)
"Teen Porno Star" (1:49)
"Sniffy" (2:03)
"Pink Power Ranger" (1:49)

1996 debut albums
Bickley (band) albums